Sweet Charity (full title: Sweet Charity: The Adventures of a Girl Who Wanted to Be Loved) is a 1969 American musical comedy-drama film directed and choreographed by Bob Fosse in his feature directorial debut, written by Peter Stone, and featuring music by Cy Coleman and Dorothy Fields.

The film stars Shirley MacLaine and features John McMartin, Sammy Davis Jr., Ricardo Montalbán, Chita Rivera, Barbara Bouchet, Paula Kelly and Stubby Kaye. It is based on the 1966 stage musical of the same name – also directed and choreographed by Fosse – which in turn is based on Federico Fellini, Ennio Flaiano and Tullio Pinelli's screenplay for Fellini's film Nights of Cabiria (Le Notti di Cabiria, 1957). Whereas Fellini's film concerns the romantic ups-and-downs of an ever-hopeful prostitute, the musical makes the central character a dancer-for-hire at a Times Square dance-hall.

The film has costumes by Edith Head.

Plot
Charity Hope Valentine works as a taxi dancer along with her friends, Nickie and Helene. She longs for love, but has bad luck with men, first seen when her married boyfriend, Charlie, pushes her off Gapstow Bridge in Central Park and steals her life savings of $427.  The Fandango Ballroom and its sleazily erotic setting are introduced by the song "Hey, Big Spender".  Charity shares her disappointment and hopes with her co-workers Nickie and Helene in several scenes throughout the film.

Somewhat later, Charity meets famous movie star Vittorio Vitale, just as he breaks up with his girlfriend Ursula. Charity goes to a nightclub, where the guests perform the "Rich Man's Frug," and later has dinner with Vittorio at his apartment.  When Vittorio leaves the room momentarily, Charity celebrates what seems to be her good fortune with the song "If They Could See Me Now". Right after, however, Ursula comes back to Vittorio, and Charity is forced to spend a humiliating night in a closet while Vittorio and Ursula make love and sleep together.  Charity again returns to the Fandango, where she, Nickie, and Helene commiserate on the building's rooftop with "There's Got to Be Something Better Than This".

Looking for a more respectable and rewarding line of work, Charity goes to an employment agency, but she is forced to admit that she has no special skills and has to leave when she admits her status.  In the building's elevator, though, Charity meets shy and claustrophobic Oscar Lindquist, and the two are attracted to each other when the elevator halts, trapping them together for hours.  The two go out together several times, including a visit to an alternative church presided over by a preacher named Big Daddy and "worshiping" with the song "The Rhythm of Life".

Although Charity has not told her background to the reserved and respectable Oscar, he proposes marriage and professes to be broadminded when she does finally tell him. Charity's hopes are once again lifted, celebrated in the huge production number "I'm a Brass Band".  Oscar meets Charity's friends at the Fandango when they throw a party for her. However at the marriage license bureau Oscar tells her that he has tried to accept her past but is unable to go through with the marriage.

Charity returns to the bridge in Central Park where she first appeared in the film and seems ready to throw herself off it, but a passing group of young hippies singing about love and peace hand her a flower, lifting her spirits.

Alternate ending
An alternate ending, included on the Laserdisc, DVD and Blu-ray releases, picks up after Oscar leaves Charity. Oscar starts to go crazy in his apartment and, feeling suffocated, goes for a walk in the park. He sees Charity on their bridge in Central Park and thinks she is going to jump. Racing to rescue her, he trips and falls in the water. Charity jumps in after him, but can't swim so Oscar rescues her. Oscar realizes Charity is the only breath of fresh air in his life, proposes again, and she accepts. Fosse thought the ending was too corny, but filmed it anticipating that the studio would demand a happy ending. In the end, they agreed with Fosse and kept the original ending from the stage version.

Cast

Musical numbers
 "My Personal Property" *
 "Big Spender"
 "The Pompeii Club"
 "Rich Man's Frug"
 "If My Friends Could See Me Now"
 "The Hustle"
 "There's Got to Be Something Better Than This"
 "It's a Nice Face" *
 "The Rhythm of Life"
 "Sweet Charity"
 "I'm a Brass Band"
 "I Love to Cry at Weddings"
 "Where Am I Going?"

* New song written for the film

Charts

Production 
Shirley MacLaine, a friend of Fosse and his wife and partner Gwen Verdon, had suggested the adaptation to Lew Wasserman, the head of Universal Pictures.  Verdon, who had starred as Charity in Fosse's original Broadway musical, had wanted to play the lead again but endorsed MacLaine to star in the film since she was a recognizable movie star. Verdon did contribute to the film, without credit, as the assistant choreographer.  Chita Rivera and Paula Kelly, who had appeared in a London stage production of the play, have supporting roles in the film.  John McMartin was the only lead actor from the Broadway version to reprise his role.

During production, Fosse had conflicts with his original producer, Ross Hunter, who was replaced by Robert Arthur.  I.A.L. Diamond, who had written the screenplays for The Apartment and Irma la Douce, both starring MacLaine and co-written and directed by Billy Wilder, was originally hired as screenwriter, but he too quit after disagreements with Fosse and was replaced by Peter Stone.   Filming took place in studios in and around Los Angeles and New York City.

Reception

Reviews
Critical reception of the film at release was mixed.  While some praised Fosse's innovative approaches to the staging of some numbers and Shirley MacLaine's performance, others found it overlong, most of the songs ineffective, and the storyline ineffectively engaging. Reviewers familiar with the stage version were especially critical.  Vincent Canby in the New York Times was especially harsh, disparaging the film as "so enlarged and so inflated that it has become another maximal movie: a long, noisy and, finally, dim imitation of its source material," and complaining that although MacLaine "often looks like Miss Verdon, she never succeeds in re-creating the eccentric line that gave cohesion to the original". The film has been reappraised over the years and has been reviewed positively. Sweet Charity has an 83% "Fresh" rating on review aggregation site Rotten Tomatoes based on 6 reviews, with an average rating of 6.40/10.

Box office
The actual cost of the film's production has been disputed, amidst conflicting accounts by Universal Pictures, reports in Variety, and claims by Fosse himself, but estimates range from more than $20 million to just $8 million. Regardless of the actual cost, the film's returns were a huge disappointment for the studio. By January 1970, the film had made only $1.1 million, just a bit more than the cost of Shirley MacLaine's salary. By 1976, according to Variety, the film earned rentals of $4,025,000 in the US and Canada.

Accolades
The film was screened at the 1969 Cannes Film Festival, but outside of the main competition.

The film is recognized by American Film Institute in these lists:
 2002: AFI's 100 Years...100 Passions – Nominated
 2004: AFI's 100 Years...100 Songs:
 "Big Spender" – Nominated
 "If My Friends Could See Me Now" – Nominated
 2006: AFI's 100 Years...100 Cheers – Nominated

Later references
 The film and its making are briefly alluded to under a different title in Fosse's autobiographical musical film All That Jazz (1979).
 The film's failure marks the first episode of Fosse/Verdon, the 2019 biographical mini-series about Fosse and Gwen Verdon, their rocky marriage, and their long creative partnership.

See also
 List of American films of 1969

References

External links
 
 
 
 

1969 films
1960s musical comedy-drama films
1960s romantic comedy-drama films
American musical comedy-drama films
American romantic comedy-drama films
American romantic musical films
Films directed by Bob Fosse
Films based on musicals based on films
Films based on musicals
Films scored by Cy Coleman
American remakes of Italian films
Universal Pictures films
1960s romantic musical films
1969 directorial debut films
1969 comedy films
1969 drama films
Adaptations of works by Federico Fellini
1960s English-language films
1960s American films